Hallicis bisetosellus is a moth in the family Blastobasidae. It is found in Costa Rica.

The length of the forewings is 4–5.9 mm. The basal third of the forewings is pale brown. The apical two-thirds is brown, gradually brightening toward the apical end of the cell. The hindwings are translucent pale brown gradually darkening to apex.

Etymology
The specific epithet is derived from Latin saeta (meaning bristle or stiff hair) and refers to the two apical setae of the digitate process originating from the base of the valva of the genitalia.

References

Moths described in 2013
Blastobasidae